Aroga is a genus of moths in the family Gelechiidae.

Species
Aroga acharnaea (Meyrick, 1927)
Aroga alleriella Busck, 1940
Aroga argutiola Hodges, 1974
Aroga aristotelis (Milliere, 1876)
Aroga atraphaxi Bidzilya, 2009
Aroga balcanicola Huemer & Karsholt, 1999
Aroga camptogramma (Meyrick, 1931)
Aroga chlorocrana (Meyrick, 1931)
Aroga compositella (Walker, 1864)
Aroga controvalva Li & Zheng, 1998
Aroga danfengensis Li & Zheng, 1998
Aroga elaboratella (Braun, 1923)
Aroga eldorada (Keifer, 1936)
Aroga epigaeella (Chambers, 1881)
Aroga eriogonella (Clarke, 1935)
Aroga flavicomella (Zeller, 1839)
Aroga gozmanyi Park, 1991
Aroga hulthemiella Kuznetsov, 1960
Aroga kurdistana Derra, 2011
Aroga leucanieella (Busck, 1910)
Aroga mesostrepta Meyrick, 1932
Aroga morenella (Busck, 1908)
Aroga panchuli Bidzilya, 2009
Aroga paraplutella (Busck, 1910)
Aroga pascuicola (Staudinger, 1871)
Aroga paulella (Busck, 1903)
Aroga rigidae (Clarke, 1935)
Aroga temporariella Sattler, 1960
Aroga thoracealbella (Chambers, 1874)
Aroga trialbamaculella (Chambers, 1875)
Aroga trilineella (Chambers, 1877)
Aroga unifasciella (Busck, 1903)
Aroga velocella (Duponchel, 1838)
Aroga websteri Clarke, 1942
Aroga xyloglypta (Meyrick, 1923)

References

 , 2009: Two new species of the genus Aroga Busck, 1914 from Tadzhikistan (Lepidoptera: Gelechiidae). Shilap Revista de Lepidopterologia 37 (147): 301-305.
 , 2011: Beschreibung neuer Arten der Familien Gelechiidae, Holcopogonidae und Oecophoridae (Lepidoptera). Esperiana Buchreihe zur Entomologie 16: 207-212.
  1998: Two new species of the genus Aroga from China (Lepidoptera: Gelechiidae). Acta Entomologica Sinica 41(1): 85 - 89. Full article: .
 , 1991: Gelechiidae (Lepidoptera) from North Korea with description of two new species. Annales historico-naturales Musei nationalis hungarici 83: 117-123. Full article: .

 
Gelechiini
Moth genera